Cupriavidus numazuensis is a bacterium of the genus Cupriavidus and family  Burkholderiaceae. It was renamed from Wautersia numazuensis.

References

External links
Type strain of Cupriavidus numazuensis at BacDive -  the Bacterial Diversity Metadatabase

Burkholderiaceae
Bacteria described in 2013